Maragatham Chandrasekar (11 November 1917 – 26 October 2001) was an Indian politician and Member of Parliament from the Indian state of Tamil Nadu.

Personal life
Maragatham Chandrasekar was born Maragatham Muniswami to Vidwan Kalathur Muniswami on 11 November 1917. She obtained her Bachelor of Science degree in India and completed diplomas in free-lance, domestic science and dietetics courses in London. She also did a course on Specialized Institution Management and Administration at London. Maragatham married R. Chandrasekar and had a son (Lalit Chandrasekhar) and a daughter, Lata Priyakumar who also served as a Member of the Legislative Assembly of Tamil Nadu.

Politics
Maragatham Chandrasekar joined the Indian National Congress and was elected to the Lok Sabha from Tiruvallur in the 1951 parliamentary elections. She served as the Member of Lok Sabha for Tiruvallur from 1951 to 1957 and Member of the Rajya Sabha from 1970 to 1988. She served as the Union Deputy Minister for Health from 1951 to 1957, Home Affairs from 1962 to 1964 and Social Welfare from 1964 to 1967. In 1972, Maragatham was elected General Secretary of the All India Congress Committee. She was governor in Punjab state.

Assassination of Rajiv Gandhi
As former Member of Parliament from Sriperumbudur, Maragatham hosted the former Indian Prime Minister Rajiv Gandhi during his visit to Sriperumbudur in 1991. She was present at the rally in Sriperumbudur where Rajiv Gandhi was assassinated.

Death
Maragatham died on 26 October 2001.

See also
 Assassination of Rajiv Gandhi

Notes

References
 
 http://www.india-today.com/itoday/20011112/despath.shtml

1917 births
2001 deaths
Alumni of King's College London
Indian National Congress politicians from Tamil Nadu
People from Kanchipuram district
India MPs 1952–1957
India MPs 1962–1967
Nominated members of the Rajya Sabha
India MPs 1984–1989
India MPs 1989–1991
India MPs 1991–1996
Lok Sabha members from Tamil Nadu
People from Nagapattinam district